Street Acquaintances (German: Strassenbekanntschaften) is a 1929 Czech-German silent film directed by Josef Medeotti-Bohác and Alwin Neuß and starring Theodor Pištěk, Blanka Svobodová and Kitty Barling.

It was shot in Prague. The film's sets were designed by Alois Mecera.

Cast
 Theodor Pištěk as Urban 
 Blanka Svobodová as Otýlie 
 Kitty Barling as Zdenka  
 Hilde Maroff as Ema  
 Nino Costantini as Florián Krauseminz  
 Werner Pittschau as Jaroslav Klement  
 Václav Zichovský as Factory Owner  
 André Mattoni as Vladimír Skála  
 Rosa Monetti as Marketa Skálová  
 Jan Richter as Zelenka  
 Antonie Nedošinská as Zelenka's Wife  
  as Mána  
 Jiří Hron as Václav  
 Hugh Douglas as Alfréd Snajdr aka Baron Freddy  
 Jindřich Plachta as Urban's Servant  
 Filip Bálek-Brodský as Wedding Guest  
 Milka Bálek-Brodská as Wedding Guest's Wife  
 Jindřich Lhoták as Doctor  
 Rudolf Stahl as Detective  
 Frank Argus as Inspector  
 Jindřich Edl as Commissioner  
 Betty Kysilková as Woman in Eden  
 Eduard Slégl as Servant

References

Bibliography
 Alfred Krautz. Encyclopedia of film directors in the United States of America and Europe, Volume 2. Saur, 1997.

External links

1929 films
Czech silent films
Films of the Weimar Republic
German silent feature films
Films directed by Alwin Neuß
German black-and-white films
Czech black-and-white films